Arpita Chakraborty is an Indian playback singer and live performer. She is the playback voice behind the song "Ras ke Bhare Tore Nain" from the film Satyagraha, "Lori Of Death" from the film Ragini MMS 2, "Paisa Yeh Paisa" from the film Total Dhamaal, "Khoya Khoya" from the film Hero, title track of the film Bezubaan Ishq, "Kanabadunaa" and "Manase Pedavina" from the Telugu film Nee Jathaga Nenundali and many more. She has sung the title song of the Television Serial Tashan-e-Ishq in 2015. She performs live on a regular basis in India and abroad.

Discography

References

External links
 
 
 

Living people
Bollywood playback singers
Indian women playback singers
21st-century Indian women singers
21st-century Indian singers
Year of birth missing (living people)
Musicians from West Bengal